Crowlands was an electoral district of the Legislative Assembly in the Australian colony of Victoria from 1859 to 1877. It was located in north-western Victoria and included the town of Swan Hill.

The district was defined as being:

Members

 = by-election

After Crowlands was abolished, John Woods went on to represent the electoral district of Stawell from its creation in 1877 to 1892.

References

Former electoral districts of Victoria (Australia)
1859 establishments in Australia
1877 disestablishments in Australia